Germano Almeida (born 31 July 1945) is a Cape Verdean author and lawyer.

Biography
Born on the Cape Verdean island Boa Vista, Almeida studied law at the University of Lisbon and currently practices in Mindelo. His novels have been translated into several languages. He married Sam Stewart in 1970.

Almeida founded the literary magazine Ponto & Vírgula (1983-87) and Aguaviva. In 1989 he founded the Ilhéu Editora publishing house and has since published 16 books (nine novels).

Published works
His first work was O dia das calças roladas which was about an account of a strike on the island of Santo Antão, it was first written in 1982 and was published in 1983.  He wrote the novel The Last Will and Testament of Senhor da Silva Araújo which was about  businessman turned philanthropist who leaves his fortune to his illegitimate daughter. As independence comes he is shown up to be a relic of colonialism.  A motion picture would be made about the novel in 1997 and was directed by the Portuguese director Francisco Manso, it won the award at the Brazil's largest film festival, the Festival de Cinema de Gramado.  He later published Dona Pura e os Camaradas de Abril in 1999, a story about the 1974 Carnation revolution in Portugal.  Cabo Verde – Viagem pela história das ilhas, published in 2003 was his historical presentation of all the nine inhabited islands that constitute Cape Verde.  His recently published novels and works were Eva in 2006 and De Monte Cara vê-se o mundo in 2014.

Awards and honors
He has been awarded the Order of the Dragon Plant - First Class, the Portuguese Order of Merit and the Camões Prize (2018).

Adaptations
The 1995 novel The Two Brothers (Os Dois Irmãos) and Agravos de um Artista (Engraved by the Artist) - a short story were performed as theatrical plays at the GTCCPPM in Mindelo, São Vicente in 1999 and in 2000.  One of the roles were done by João Branco.

Bibliography
O dia das calças roladas (1982) First published on Ilhéu Editora, Cape Verde.
The Last Will and Testament of Senhor da Silva Araújo (Ilhéu Editora, 1989, republished by New Directions, 2004) (Portuguese: "O Testamento do Senhor Napumoceno da Silva Araújo") 
My Poet (1992) (Portuguese: "O meu poeta") 
Fantastic Island (1994) (Portuguese: "A ilha fantástica") 
Two Brothers (1995) (Portuguese: "Os dois irmãos") 
Tales From the House (1996) (Portuguese: "Estórias de dentro de casa") (Short stories.) .
A morte do meu poeta (1998) Only published by the author, as it was too critical towards the ruling party at the time (MpD) for the local publisher, Ilhéu (actually he owns a part of the publishing company himself). The Poet turns into a corrupt politician and is eventually eaten by a shark!
A Família Trago (1998) A funny family chronicle from the author's island of birth, Boa Vista) 
Estórias contadas (1998) Chronicles published in the Portuguese newspaper Público
Dona Pura e os Camaradas de Abril (1999) 
As memórias de um espírito (2001) An account of an erotic life, told by the deceased's spirit. Almeida style humour! 
Cabo Verde – Viagem pela história das ilhas (2003) 
O mar na Lajinha (2004) More erotic stories, from a group of people meeting regularly for a swim at the Lajinha beach on the island of São Vicente. 
Eva: romance (2006) 
A morte do ouvidor (2010) 
De Monte Cara vê-se o mundo (2014)
O Fiel Defunto (2018)

References

Further reading
Paula Gândara: Construindo Germano Almeida : a consciência da desconstrução. Vega, Lisbon 2008, .
Maria Manuela Lopes Guerreiro: Germano de Almeida e a nova escrita cabo-verdiana : um estudo de O Testamento do Sr. Napomuceno da Silva Araújo. Centro Cultura Português, Praia/Mindelo 1998.

External links
Short biography at Camino Publishers website 
 Germano Almeida at Lusofonia 
Literature by and about Germano Almeida - in a catalog at the Ibero-Panamerican Institute, Berlin 
Interview with the author at the newspaper La Jibarilla 
Germano Almeida at Bok & Bibliotek 

1945 births
Living people
Cape Verdean male writers
People from Boa Vista, Cape Verde
Cape Verdean lawyers
Order of Merit (Portugal)
Camões Prize winners
Cape Verdean novelists
Cape Verdean short story writers
20th-century novelists
20th-century short story writers
20th-century lawyers
20th-century male writers
21st-century novelists
21st-century short story writers
21st-century lawyers
21st-century male writers
Male novelists
Male short story writers